

List

References

N